The Solomon Islands national rugby league team (nicknamed the Solies) represents the Solomon Islands in the sport of rugby league football.

History

Rugby league in the Solomon Islands has existed sporadically since the 1990s. The Solomon Islands Rugby League Federation was officially formed in 2008 and the national team played its first official match in 2013, losing to Vanuatu on October 7.

Solomon Islands participated in the 2015 Pacific Games, their first international rugby league tournament.
Solomon Islands participated in the 2018 Emerging Nations World Championship.

Current squad
Squad selected for the 2018 Emerging Nations World Championship.
Henry Angikimua (Coral Sea Roosters)
Shatler Angikitasi (Soli Solitudes)
Joshua Fiumae (Honiara Hurricanes)
Damien Horoi (Corrimal)
Wilson Ifunoa (Soli Solitudes)
Steve Kauga (Soli Solitudes)
Gareth Kengalu (Coral Sea Roosters)
Gary Kiliko (Honiara Hurricanes)
Elton Loea (Soli Solitudes)
Jimmy Maebata (Tigoa Tigers)
Mostyn Meanu’u (Kira Kira Kutters)
Ezikiel Mana(Kira Kira Kutters)
Fraser Manau (Honiara Hurricanes)
Eddie Moe’ava (Kira Kira Kutters)
Steven Momoa (Gizo Giants)
Francis Ramo (Soli Solitudes)
Metcalf Sa’atai (Honiara Hurricanes)
Timo Sanga (Kira Kira Kutters)
Daniel Saomatangi (Coral Sea Roosters)
Scott Saonuku (Coral Sea Roosters)
Jefferson Scott (Kira Kira Kutters)
Moses Singamoana (Coral Sea Roosters)
Ronsly Tango (Kira Kira Kutters)
Tony Taupongi (Coral Sea Roosters)
Allen Junior Tavake (Coral Sea Roosters)
Ozil Tela (Kira Kira Kutters)
Carlwyn Tengemoana (Honiara Hurricanes)
Billy Junior Toate’e (Soli Solitudes)
Darwyn Tongaka (Honiara Hurricanes)
Larvenstarr Tongaka (Honiara Hurricanes)
Frank Vaikai (Coral Sea Roosters)

Record

All-time results record and ranking

Below is table of the official representative rugby league matches played by Solomon Islands until 24 December 2020.

See also

Rugby league in the Solomon Islands

References

External links

National rugby league teams
R